The following things have been named after Mikalojus Konstantinas Čiurlionis:

2420 Čiurlionis
M. K. Čiurlionis Bridge
M. K. Čiurlionis National Art Museum
National M. K. Čiurlionis School of Art
 Čiurlionis Mountain, a basalt mountain by the Tikhaya Bay at the Hooker Island, Franz Josef Land, Russia. 
 Čiurlionis Peak: In 1964, Lithuanian alpinists climbed several peaks of the Pamir Mountains in Tajik SSR and named the first one (5794 m)  Čiurlionis Peak under the suggestion of a team member, pianist Aleksandras Jurgelionis. While this name is well-known to Lithuanian mountaineers, it is typically not listed on the maps or in non-Lithuanian sources about Tajikistan.

References

Ciurlionis, Mikaloujus Konstantinas